Iddo is an unincorporated community in Taylor County, Florida, in the United States. It was named, along with Eridu, Florida, by Atlantic Coast Line Railroad chief engineer J.E. Willoughby.

References

Unincorporated communities in Taylor County, Florida